The Exeter Book riddles are a fragmentary collection of verse riddles in Old English found in the later tenth-century anthology of Old English poetry known as the Exeter Book. Today standing at around ninety-four (scholars debate precisely how many there are because divisions between poems are not always clear), the Exeter Book riddles account for almost all the riddles attested in Old English, and a major component of the otherwise mostly Latin corpus of riddles from early medieval England.

Sources
One riddle, known as Exeter Book riddle 30 is found twice in the Exeter Book (with some textual variation), indicating that the Exeter Book was compiled from more than one pre-existing manuscript collection of Old English riddles. Considerable scholarly effort has gone into reconstructing what these exemplars may have been like.

Four of the riddles originate as translations from the Latin riddles of Aldhelm, emphasising that the Exeter Book riddles were at least partly influenced by Latin riddling in early medieval England: riddles 35 (mailcoat, also found in an eighth-century version in a ninth-century manuscript), and 40, 66, and 94 (all derived from Aldhelm's hundredth riddle, De creatura).

Some riddles seem to have come directly from vernacular tradition.

Form and style
The riddles are all written in alliterative verse, and frequently end with an injunction to 'say what I am called', suggesting that they were recited as oral entertainment. Like other Old English poetry, the riddles make extensive use of compound nouns and adjectives. When metaphorical, these compounds become what could be considered riddles within the riddle itself, and the audience must be attentive to any double meanings or "hinge words" in order to discover the answer to the riddle. The riddles offer a new perspective on the mundane world and often poetically personify their subject. In this respect, they can be situated within a wider tradition of 'speaking objects' in Anglo-Saxon culture and have much in common with poems such as The Dream of the Rood and The Husband's Message and with artefacts such as the Franks Casket, Alfred Jewel, and Brussels Cross, which endow inanimate things with first-person voices.

Unlike the Latin riddles from early medieval England, the Old English ones tend not to rely on intellectual obscurity to make the riddle more difficult for the reader, rather focusing on describing processes of manufacture and transformation. And again in contrast to manuscripts of the Latin riddles, the Exeter Book does not state the solutions to its riddles. The search for their solutions has been addressed at length by Patrick J. Murphy, focusing on thought patterns of the period, but there is still no unanimous agreement on some of them.

Contents
The Exeter Book riddles are varied in theme, but they are all used to engage and challenge the readers mentally. By representing the familiar, material world from an oblique angle, many not only draw on but also complicate or challenge social norms such as martial masculinity, patriarchal attitudes to women, lords' dominance over their servants, and humans' over animals. Thirteen, for example, have as their solution an implement, which speaks of itself through the riddle as a servant to its lord; but these sometimes also suggest the power of the servant to define the master.

The majority of the riddles have religious themes and answers. Some of the religious contexts within the riddles are "manuscript book (or Bible)," "soul and body," "fish and river" (fish are often used to symbolize Christ). The riddles also were written about common objects, and even animals were used as inspiration for some of the riddles. One example of a typical, religious riddle is Riddle 41, which describes the soul and body:

A noble guest of great lineage dwells
In the house of man.  Grim hunger
Cannot harm him, nor feverish thirst,
Nor age, nor illness.  If the servant
Of the guest who rules, serves well
On the journey, they will find together
Bliss and well-being, a feast of fate;
If the slave will not as a brother be ruled
By a lord he should fear and follow
Then both will suffer and sire a family
Of sorrows when, springing from the world,
They leave the bright bosom of one kinswoman,
Mother and sister, who nourished them.
Let the man who knows noble words
Say what the guest and servant are called.

Trans. by Craig Williamson, A Feast of Creatures: Anglo-Saxon Riddle-Songs (1982)

While the Exeter Book was found in a cathedral library, and while it is clear that religious scribes worked on the riddles, not all of the riddles in the book are religiously themed.  Many of the answers to the riddles are everyday, common objects. There are also many double entendres, which can lead to an answer that is obscene. One example of this is Riddle 23/25:

I am wonderful help to women,
The hope of something to come. I harm
No citizen except my slayer.
Rooted I stand on a high bed.
I am shaggy below. Sometimes the beautiful
Peasant's daughter, an eager-armed,
Proud woman grabs my body,
Rushes my red skin, holds me hard,
Claims my head. The curly-haired
Woman who catches me fast will feel
Our meeting. Her eye will be wet.
Trans. by Craig Williamson, A Feast of Creatures: Anglo-Saxon Riddle-Songs (1982)

One of the first answers that readers might think of would be an onion. If the reader pays close attention to the wording in the latter half of the riddle, however, he or she may be led to believe that the answer is a man's penis. Both of these answers are perfectly legitimate answers to this riddle, but one is very innocent where the other is obscene. Riddles in which such double entendre is thought to be prominent in the Exeter Book are: 2 (ox and hide), 20 (sword), 25 (onion), 37 (bellows), 42 (cock and hen), 44 (key and lock), 45 (dough), 54 (churn and butter), 61 (mailshirt or helmet), 62 (poker), 63 (glass beaker), 64 (Lot and his family), 65 (onion), 91 (key). Even though some of the riddles contained obscene meanings, that is not to say that the majority of riddles in the Exeter Book were obscene. There were more religious and animalistic riddles than obscene riddles.

Since the riddles were crammed into the pages of the manuscript with hardly any organization, many of the riddles vary in structure.  The boundaries between riddles were often unclear. In fact, some remain unanswered to this day, such as 95:

I am noble, known to rest in the quiet
Keeping of many men, humble and high born.
The plunderers’ joy, hauled far from friends,
Rides richly on me, shines signifying power,
Whether I proclaim the grandeur of halls,
The wealth of cities, or the glory of God.
Now wise men love most my strange way
Of offering wisdom to many without voice.
Though the children of earth eagerly seek
To trace my trail, sometimes my tracks are dim.

Trans. by Craig Williamson, A Feast of Creatures: Anglo-Saxon Riddle-Songs (1982)

List of Exeter Book Riddles

The Exeter Book Riddles have the following solutions (according to the Riddle Ages blog and Paull F. Baum), and numbered according to the edition by Krapp and Dobbie.

Editions and translations
 Andy Orchard (ed. and trans.), The Old English and Anglo-Latin Riddle Tradition, Dumbarton Oaks Medieval Library 69 (Cambridge, MA: Harvard University Press, 2021); accompanied by Andy Orchard, A Commentary on the Old English and Anglo-Latin Riddle Tradition, Supplements to the Dumbarton Oaks Medieval Library (Washington, DC: Dumbarton Oaks, 2021).
 The Riddle Ages: Early Medieval Riddles, Translations and Commentaries, ed. by Megan Cavell and others, 2nd edn (Birmingham: University of Birmingham, 2020–).
 Martin Foys, et al. (eds) Old English Poetry in Facsimile Project (Madison, WI: Center for the History of Print and Digital Culture, 2019-), with translations from the Old English Poetry Project, Aaron Hostetter (trans.).

Edition only
The Riddles of the Exeter Book, ed. by Frederick Tupper (Boston: Ginn, c1910), archive.org, Wikimedia Commons
Elliott van Kirk Dobbie and George Philip Krapp (eds), The Exeter Book, Anglo-Saxon Poetic Records 3 (New York: Columbia University Press, 1936), digitised at https://web.archive.org/web/20181206091232/http://ota.ox.ac.uk/desc/3009
 Craig Williamson (ed), The Old English Riddles of the Exeter Book (Chapel Hill: University of North Carolina Press, 1977)
 Bernard J. Muir (ed), The Exeter Anthology of Old English Poetry: An Edition of Exeter Dean and Chapter MS 3501, 2nd edn, 2 vols (Exeter: University of Exeter Press, 2000)

Translation only 
 Paull F. Baum, Anglo-Saxon Riddles of the Exeter Book (Durham, North Carolina: Duke University Press, 1963), https://en.wikisource.org/wiki/Anglo-Saxon_Riddles_of_the_Exeter_Book
 Kevin Crossley-Holland (trans), The Exeter Book Riddles, revised edition (London: Enitharmon Press, 2008)
 Greg Delanty, Seamus Heaney and Michael Matto, The Word Exchange: Anglo-Saxon Poems in Translation (New York: Norton, 2010)
 F. H. Whitman (ed and trans), Old English Riddles (Ottawa: Canadian Federation for the Humanities, 1982)
 Craig Williamson (trans), A Feast of Creatures: Anglo-Saxon Riddle-Songs (Philadelphia: University of Pennsylvania Press, 1982)

References

Riddles
Old English poetry